Robert McKeen  (12 July 1884 – 5 August 1974) was a New Zealand politician of the Labour Party. He was Speaker of the House of Representatives.

Early life
He was born in 1884 in Edinburgh and received his education in West Calder, West Lothian, Scotland. In Scotland, he was active in the labour movement, and worked as a grocer's assistant in a co-operative store. He emigrated to New Zealand in 1909, and worked in coal mines on the West Coast before moving to Wellington, and a grocery store. He was a union official.

Political career

He was the Member of Parliament for Wellington South from 1922 to 1946, then Island Bay from 1946 to 1954, when he retired. McKeen was Labour's junior whip in 1935 and 1936, and its senior whip in 1937 and 1938. He was Chairman of Committees from 1939 to 1946. Subsequent to that, he was the twelfth Speaker of the House of Representatives, from 1947 to 1950.

He was on the Wellington City Council for 18 years, and the Wellington Harbour Board for nine years. Bob Semple and McKeen were the only Labour city councillors during 1927–1929, and they were also parliamentary colleagues. They were close friends, and retired from parliament at the same time. McKeen stood for the Wellington mayoralty and the Council in 1941, but was defeated by the incumbent Thomas Hislop in a swing against Labour. He also lost his seat on the council, although he was the highest polling candidate not elected, and in 1938 he had been the second highest-polling candidate elected. He was later appointed to fill the vacancy on the council in 1942 caused by Len McKenzie's death. At the 1944 local elections he was nominated to be Labour's candidate for the mayoralty once again, one of five nominees he declined to stand for selection with Labour Party president James Roberts prevailing.

He was Mayor of Otaki for six years in the 1950s.

In 1935, McKeen was awarded the King George V Silver Jubilee Medal. He was appointed a Companion of the Order of St Michael and St George in the 1960 Queen's Birthday Honours, for services in public affairs as a trade unionist, Member of Parliament and Speaker of the House of Representatives.

Family and death
He married Jessie Russell, the daughter of Robert Russell. He died in Otaki on 5 August 1974, and was buried at the Kelvin Grove Cemetery in Palmerston North.

Notes

References

Who’s Who in New Zealand (7th Edition, 1961).

|-

|-

|-

|-

|-

1884 births
1974 deaths
New Zealand Labour Party MPs
New Zealand MPs for Wellington electorates
Speakers of the New Zealand House of Representatives
Members of the New Zealand House of Representatives
Footballers from West Lothian
Scottish emigrants to New Zealand
Wellington City Councillors
New Zealand trade unionists
Mayors of places in Manawatū-Whanganui
New Zealand Companions of the Order of St Michael and St George
Burials at Kelvin Grove Cemetery
Wellington Harbour Board members